Cageball is a sport invented by the football coach Jörg Berger, seeking a way to play football (U.S. English: soccer) despite bad winter conditions.

It is similar to traditional indoor football, although with some changes: as the name implies, one plays in a cage. Due to the enclosed environment, the game is faster and more dynamic, and putting greater emphasis on football technique.

Playing field 
Cageball is played on artificial turf. The playing field is usually 23x15 metres, but can vary somewhat due to hall constraints. The entire field is surrounded by a one-metre-high wall or fence, out of which extends a net for a further four metres upwards. This way, the ball is always in play, obsoleting all out-of-bound rules. Usually, a Cageball team consists of three field players and a goalkeeper, the latter which can also assume a "flying" role.

Rules 
Normal football rules apply when it comes to fouls and deliberate hand usage. Free kicks must be immediately carried out. The offside is not observed, and there are no throw-ins or goal kicks.

See also 
Jorkyball
:da:Panna

External links 
 The official Cageball site, in German
 The official Norwegian Cageball site
 UK team, Sassco's game played in the Dusseldorf venue

Ball games
Association football variants